Sontha Ooru (English: Native village) is a 2009 Telugu film starring Raja, Thirtha, L.B. Sriram in main roles. It was directed by P. Sunil Kumar Reddy. The film was screened at Several National & International film festivals like Mumbai Film Festival & Pune International Film Festival. The film received four Nandi Awards.

Sontha Ooru is a film about rural life and how the innocent villagers are continuously exploited by the development plans of the government. The film portrays the Special economic zone victims and its impact on normal life.

Cast
 Raja as Bujjigadu
 L.B. Sriram as Rudrudu
 Theertha as Malli
 Jeeva as Naidu
 Vijayachander as Reddy
 Tanikella Bharani as Devudu Babu
 Dheer Charan Srivastav as Car mechanic
 M S Narayana
 Jaya Prakash Reddy
 Rallapalli

Accolades

Awards
 Nandi Awards of 2009
 Best Feature Film
 Best Actress - Thirtha
 Best Character Actor - L.B. Sriram
 Best Dialogue Writer - L.B. Sriram

Screening
The film was screened at following film festivals:
 11th Mumbai Film Festival
 8th Pune International Film Festival
 14th International Film Festival of Kerala

References

External links
 

2000s Telugu-language films
2009 films
Indian drama films